The 1909 Oklahoma Sooners football team represented the University of Oklahoma as an independent during the 1909 college football season. In their fifth year under head coach Bennie Owen, the Sooners compiled a 6–4 record, and outscored their opponents by a combined total of 203 to 107.

Schedule

References

Oklahoma
Oklahoma Sooners football seasons
Oklahoma Sooners football